Clothes Make the Man (German: Kleider machen Leute) is a 1921 Austrian-German silent film based on the 1874 novella by Gottfried Keller, directed by Hans Steinhoff and starring Hermann Thimig, Dora Kaiser and Hugo Thimig.

Cast
Hermann Thimig as Jaro Sprapinsky  
Dora Kaiser as Nettchen  
Hugo Thimig as Wirt zur goldenen Waage  
Thea Oesey as Erika  
Wilhelm Schmidt as Melchior Böhnli  
Franz Kammauf as bailiff  
Cornelius Kirschner as pastor  
Eugen Guenther as pharmacist  
Fritz Strassny as professor  
Josef Moser as notary  
Victor Kutschera as beggar  
Hans Thimig as fool

Reception
Writing for the Deutsche Allgemeine Zeitung E. K. commented: "Hans Steinhoff leads an excellent stylistically true and artistically extremely commendable artistic direction, which really conjures back a 'happier' Biedermeier time and knows how to find amusing and trusting motifs. It's an absolutely German game with all the familiar beauty we love about Gottfried Keller. In the sometimes simple, undemanding way, Steinhoff's direction is reminiscent of Lang's Tired Death. A great success of Ufa".

See also
Clothes Make the Man (1940)

References

External links

1920s historical films
Austrian historical films
German historical films
Austrian silent feature films
Films of the Weimar Republic
Films directed by Hans Steinhoff
German silent feature films
Films based on Swiss novels
Films based on works by Gottfried Keller
Films set in the 1830s
Films about con artists
German black-and-white films
1920s German films